Parascombrops philippinensis, the sharptooth seabass, is a species of fish in the family Acropomatidae, the lanternbellies. It usually inhabits a depth of 180–220 metres and lives in and around the Indian Ocean and the Pacific Ocean, where it reaches a length of around 13 centimetres.

References

philippinensis
Fish described in 1880
Taxa named by Albert Günther